Mosharraf Hossain (died 19 August 1999) was a Bangladesh Awami League politician who served as a Jatiya Sangsad member representing the Faridpur-4 constituency.

Career
Hossain was a veteran of the Bengali Language movement. He fought in the Bangladesh Liberation war. He was elected to parliament from Faridpur-4 as a Bangladesh Awami League candidate in 1991 and won again in 1996.

Death
Hossain died on 19 August 1999. He was succeeded by his wife, Saleha Mosharraf, in his constituency.

References

1999 deaths
People from Faridpur District
Awami League politicians
5th Jatiya Sangsad members
7th Jatiya Sangsad members
Place of birth missing
Date of birth missing